Susil Kar College, established in 1968, is an undergraduate college in Ghoshpur, Champahati, West Bengal, India. It is affiliated with the University of Calcutta.

Departments

Science

Chemistry
Physics
Mathematics
Computer Science

Arts and Commerce

Bengali
English
Sanskrit
History
Geography
Political Science
Education
Philosophy
Economics
Defence Studies
Physical Education
Commerce

Accreditation
Susil Kar College is recognized by the University Grants Commission (UGC).

See also 
List of colleges affiliated to the University of Calcutta
Education in India
Education in West Bengal

References

External links
Sushil Kar College

Educational institutions established in 1968
University of Calcutta affiliates
Universities and colleges in South 24 Parganas district
1968 establishments in West Bengal

″″